Krong Pinang (Malay: Kampung Pinang, Patani Malay: کامڤوڠ ڤينڠ) is a district (amphoe) of Yala province, southern Thailand, established by the Royal Decree Establishing Amphoe Krong Pinang, Changwat Yala, BE 2547 (2004), which came into force on 8 October 2004.

Etymology
The name Krong Pinang is a Thai corruption of Kampung Pinang (Jawi: كامڤوڠ ڤينڠ), its original Malay name means 'village of Pinang'. The word pinang means 'betel palm' or 'betel nut tree' (Areca catechu) in Malay.

History
The minor district (king amphoe) Krong Pinang was established on 30 April 1994, when four tambons were split off from Mueang Yala district. It was upgraded to a full district on 8 October 2004.

Geography
Neighboring districts are (from the east clockwise): Raman, Bannang Sata, Yaha, and Mueang Yala of Yala Province.

Administration
The district is divided into four sub-districts (tambons), which are further subdivided into 23 villages (mubans). There are no municipal (thesaban) areas. There are four tambon administrative organizations (TAO).

References

External links
amphoe.com

Districts of Yala province